Hemananda Biswal (1 December 1939 – 25 February 2022) was an Indian politician. Biswal served as Chief Minister of Odisha from 7 December 1989 to 5 March 1990, and again from 6 December 1999 to 5 March 2000. 

He was also the MP of Sundergarh from 2009 to 2014. Biswal was the first Tribal chief Minister of Odisha.

Early life and education
Biswal was born in Thakurpada village of Odisha on 1 December 1939, to Basudev and Trimani Biswal. He completed intermediate education from Government College, Sundargarh, and by profession was an agriculturist.

Political career
In 1974, he was elected for the first time to the Odisha Legislative Assembly and served until 1977. Later, in 1980, he was again elected from the Jharsuguda as MLA, a position he held until 2004. He was the chief minister of Odisha for the first time from 7 December 1989 to 5 March 1990 and for the second time from 6 December 1999 to 5 March 2000. From 2009 to 2014, he was the MP from Sundargarh.

Personal life and death
Biswal was married to Urmila Biswal and together they had five daughters. He died at a private hospital in Bhubaneswar on 25 February 2022, at the age of 82. He suffered from pneumonia and COVID-19 prior to his death.

References

External links
Orissa Chief Ministers List
Orissa Chief Ministers
Profile of Hemanand Biswal 
Orisha
India Government Archive 
Official biographical sketch in Parliament of India website

1939 births
2022 deaths
India MPs 2009–2014
Chief ministers from Indian National Congress
Chief Ministers of Odisha
Deputy chief ministers of Odisha
Indian National Congress politicians
Lok Sabha members from Odisha
People from Odisha
People from Sundergarh district
United Progressive Alliance candidates in the 2014 Indian general election
Deaths from the COVID-19 pandemic in India